Ancyroclepsis is a genus of moths belonging to the subfamily Tortricinae of the family Tortricidae.

Species
Ancyroclepsis nakhasathieni Tuck, 1995
Ancyroclepsis rhodoconia Diakonoff, 1976

See also
List of Tortricidae genera

References

 , 2005: World Catalogue of Insects volume 5 Tortricidae.
 , 1976, Zool. Verh. Leiden 144: 94.

External links
Tortricid.net

Archipini
Tortricidae genera
Taxa named by Alexey Diakonoff